Ampelopsin B is a stilbenoid dimer found in Ampelopsis glandulosa var. hancei (formerly Ampelopsis brevipedunculata var. hancei).

References 

Stilbenoid dimers
Ampelopsis